Nitrilimines or nitrile amides are a class of organic compounds sharing a common functional group with the general structure R-CN-NR corresponding to the conjugate base of an amine bonded to the N-terminus of a nitrile. The dominant structure for the parent compound nitrilimine is that of the propargyl-like  in scheme 1 with a C-N triple bond and with a formal positive charge on nitrogen and two lone pairs and a formal negative charge on the terminal nitrogen. Other structures such as hypervalent , allene-like , allylic  and carbene  are of lesser relevance.

Nitrilimines were first observed in the thermal decomposition of 2-tetrazoles releasing nitrogen:

A major use is in heterocyclic synthesis. E.g. with alkynes they generate pyrazoles in a 1,3-dipolar cycloaddition. Due to their high energy, they are usually generated in situ as a reactive intermediate.

References 

Functional groups